Gautier is a French surname. Notable people with the surname include: 

Armand Gautier (1825–1894), French painter and lithographer
Cyril Gautier (born 1987), French cyclist
Dick Gautier (1931–2017), actor
Émile Gautier (1853–1937), anarchist and later a journalist
Eugène Gautier (1822–1878), French composer and violinist
Jean-Alfred Gautier (1793–1881), Swiss astronomer
Judith Gautier (1845–1917), French author, daughter of Théophile
Léon Gautier (1832–1897), French paleographer
Louis Gautier (1810–1884), French Bonapartist politician 
Lucien Gautier (1850–1924), Swiss theologian
Marthe Gautier (1925–2022), French medical doctor and researcher
Paul Ferdinand Gautier (1842–1909), French scientific instrument maker
René François Gautier (1851–1936), French politician
Théophile Gautier (1811–1872), French author

Germanic-language surnames
Surnames of French origin
Surnames from given names